Becca is a feminine given name, often a short form of Rebecca; however, it is also a name in its own right.

People

In arts and media

Music
Becca (Singer, Songwriter), (Born 1994), Venezuelan Urban Singer
Beca (musician), American singer
Becca (Ghanaian singer) (born 1984), Ghanaian Afropop singer, songwriter and actress Rebecca Akosua Acheampomaa Acheampong
Becca (musician) (born 1989), American singer, songwriter, and guitarist Rebecca Hollcraft, lead singer of Stars In Stereo
Becca Albee, American musician and visual artist
Becca Barlow (born 1985), American rock guitarist and background singer
Becca Bradley (born 1991), American Christian musician
Becca Stevens (born 1984), American singer and guitarist
Becca Tobin (born 1986), American actress, singer and dancer

Other media
Becca Albee, American musician and visual artist
Becca Bernstein (born 1977), American artist
Becca Fitzpatrick (born 1979), American author
Becca Kufrin (born 1990), American reality TV star
Becca Tobin (born 1986), American actress, singer and dancer

In sport
Becca Hamilton (born 1990), American curler
Becca Longo (born 1999), American football kicker, first woman to earn a college football scholarship to an NCAA school at the Division II level or higher
Becca Pizzi (born 1980), American marathon runner
Becca Swanson (born 1973), American bodybuilder and powerlifter
Rebecca Ward (born 1990), American sabre fencer

In other fields
Becca Balint (born 1968), American educator, writer and politician
Becca Stevens (priest) (born 1963), American Episcopal priest

Fictional characters
Becca Chang, in The Loud House and The Casagrandes
Becca Corbett, in the 2010 film Rabbit Hole, played by Nicole Kidman
 Becca Fisher, on the Canadian TV series Flash Forward
Becca Hays, in True Detective season 3
 Becca Hayton, on the soap opera Hollyoaks
Becca Swanson, on the British soap opera EastEnders
Becca, a young aspiring witch from the film Hocus Pocus 2

Other uses
Becca (film), a 1989 British-Australian television film
Becca, in the Old English poem Widsith, the ruler of the Banings

See also
Beca (disambiguation)
Rebecca (given name)

References

English feminine given names
English-language feminine given names
Hypocorisms